The following is a list of Penn State University American football players.

Current NFL players
Marcus Allen - Pittsburgh Steelers - safety
Adrian Amos – Green Bay Packers – safety
Troy Apke - Washington Redskins- safety
Saquon Barkley - NY Giants - running back
Ryan Bates - Buffalo Bills - offensive tackle
Nick Bowers - Las Vegas Raiders – tight end
Cameron Brown - New York Giants - linebacker
Jason Cabinda - Detroit Lions - fullback
Dan Chisena - Minnesota Vikings - wide receiver
Jack Crawford – Tennessee Titans – Defensive Tackle/End
Sam Ficken - Tennessee Titans - placekicker
Pat Freiermuth - Pittsburgh Steelers - tight end
Mike Gesicki - Miami Dolphins - tight end
Blake Gillikin - New Orleans Saints - punter
Kevin Givens - San Francisco 49ers - defensive tackle
Chris Godwin - Tampa Bay Buccaneers - wide receiver 
Robbie Gould – San Francisco 49ers – placekicker
Yetur Gross-Matos - Carolina Panthers - defensive end
Grant Haley - Los Angeles Rams - cornerback
DaeSean Hamilton - Denver Broncos - wide receiver
K. J. Hamler - Denver Broncos - wide receiver
Jesse James – Detroit Lions – tight end 
Austin Johnson – NY Giants – nose tackle 
DaQuan Jones – Carolina Panthers – defensive end 
Michal Menet – Green Bay Packers – center
Connor McGovern (American football, born 1997) - Dallas Cowboys - center
Trace McSorley - Arizona Cardinals - quarterback
Shareef Miller - Carolina Panthers - defensive end
Carl Nassib – Las Vegas Raiders – outside linebacker
Amani Oruwariye - Detroit Lions - cornerback
Odafe Oweh - Baltimore Ravens - defensive end
Micah Parsons - Dallas Cowboys - linebacker
John Reid - Seattle Seahawks - cornerback
Allen Robinson – Los Angeles Rams – wide receiver
Miles Sanders - Philadelphia Eagles - running back
Nick Scott - Los Angeles Rams - safety
Donovan Smith – Tampa Bay Buccaneers – offensive tackle 
Shaka Toney – Washington Commanders – defensive end
Ross Travis – Cleveland Browns – tight end 
Robert Windsor – Indianapolis Colts - defensive tackle
Will Fries - Indianapolis Colts - offensive tackle
Jahan Dotson – Washington Commanders- wide receiver

Current NFL free agents
 
Mike Hull – linebacker 
Michael Mauti – Quaza, #56
Nathan Stupar – linebacker 
Cameron Wake – defensive end, #91
Trevor Williams - cornerback

Current CFL players

AJ Wallace – Calgary Stampeders – cornerback
Daryll Clark – Free Agent – cut by Stampeders on May 10, 2011

Current USFL players
Christian Campbell - Tampa Bay Bandits - cornerback

Current XFL players

Current Indoor Football League players

Rodney Kinlaw – Omaha Beef – running back

Current United Football League players

Calvin Lowry – Omaha Nighthawks – safety #37

Current Arena Football League players

Josh Gaines – Pittsburgh Power – defensive end
Jerome Hayes – Philadelphia Soul – defensive lineman
Anthony Morelli – Pittsburgh Power – quarterback
Tyrell Sales – Jacksonville Sharks – linebacker

Former NFL players

Anthony Adams – Chicago Bears, San Francisco 49ers – defensive tackle
Rogers Alexander – New York Jets, New England Patriots – linebacker
Mike Alexander – Los Angeles Raiders, Buffalo Bills – wide receiver
Doug Allen - Buffalo Bills - linebacker
Kurt Allerman – St. Louis Cardinals, Green Bay Packers, Detroit Lions – linebacker
Richie Anderson – New York Jets, Dallas Cowboys – running back
Mike Archie – Oilers/Tennessee Titans – running back
LaVar Arrington – Washington Redskins, New York Giants – linebacker
Walker Lee Ashley – Minnesota Vikings, Kansas City Chiefs – linebacker
Chris Bahr – Cincinnati Bengals, Oakland Raiders, San Diego Chargers – placekicker
Matt Bahr – Pittsburgh Steelers, Cleveland Browns, San Francisco 49ers, New York Giants, New England Patriots, Philadelphia Eagles – placekicker
Ralph Baker – New York Jets – linebacker
Bruce Bannon – Miami Dolphins – linebacker
Stew Barber – Buffalo Bills – offensive guard (AFL)
Lou Benfatti – New York Jets – defensive tackle
Brad Benson – New York Giants – offensive lineman
Tom Bill – Buffalo Bills – quarterback
Todd Blackledge – Kansas City Chiefs, Pittsburgh Steelers – quarterback
NaVorro Bowman – San Francisco 49ers – linebacker
Brett Brackett  – tight end
Dave Bradley – Green Bay Packers, St. Louis Cardinals, Chicago Fire (WFL) – offensive lineman
Kyle Brady – New York Jets, Jacksonville Jaguars, New England Patriots – tight end
Bruce Branch – Washington Redskins – cornerback
John Bronson – Arizona Cardinals – tight end/fullback
Courtney Brown – Cleveland Browns, Denver Broncos – defensive end
Gary Brown – Houston Oilers, San Diego Chargers, New York Giants – tailback
Levi Brown – offensive tackle
Todd Burger – Chicago Bears, New York Jets – offensive guard
Deon Butler – wide receiver
Greg Buttle – New York Jets – linebacker
Gerald Cadogan – Carolina Panthers, Indianapolis Colts, Calgary Stampeders – offensive lineman 
John Cappelletti – Los Angeles Rams, San Diego Chargers – running back
Ki-Jana Carter – Cincinnati Bengals, Washington Redskins, New Orleans Saints – tailback
Jimmy Cefalo – Miami Dolphins – wide receiver
Bruce Clark – New Orleans Saints, Kansas City Chiefs – defensive lineman
Duffy Cobbs – New England Patriots – defensive back
Dan Connor – Panthers, Giants, Cowboys- linebacker
Ron Coder – Pittsburgh Steelers, Seattle Seahawks, St. Louis Cardinals, Denver Broncos, Philadelphia Stars (USFL) – offensive lineman
Kerry Collins – Carolina Panthers, New Orleans Saints, Oakland Raiders, New York Giants, Tennessee Titans, Indianapolis Colts – quarterback
Andre Collins – Washington Redskins, Cincinnati Bengals, Detroit Lions
Shane Conlan – Buffalo Bills, Los Angeles Rams – linebacker
Chris Conlin – Miami Dolphins, Indianapolis Colts – offensive lineman
Bill Contz – Cleveland Browns, New Orleans Saints – offensive lineman
Brett Conway – Green Bay Packers, New York Jets, Oakland Raiders, Washington Redskins, Cleveland Browns, New York Giants – placekicker
Ron Crosby – New Orleans Saints, New York Jets, Pittsburgh Maulers (USFL), Philadelphia Stars (USFL) – linebacker
Randy Crowder – Miami Dolphins, Tampa Bay Buccaneers – defensive lineman
Chris Devlin – Cincinnati Bengals, Chicago Bears – linebacker
Mark D'Onofrio – Green Bay Packers – linebacker
Keith Dorney – Detroit Lions – offensive lineman
D.J. Dozier – Minnesota Vikings, Detroit Lions – running back
Troy Drayton – Los Angeles Rams, Miami Dolphins, Kansas City Chiefs, Green Bay Packers – tight end
Chuck Drazenovich – Washington Redskins – linebacker
Eddie Drummond – Detroit Lions, Kansas City Chiefs, Pittsburgh Steelers – wide receiver, kick returner
Roger Duffy – New York Jets, Pittsburgh Steelers – offensive lineman
Bill Dugan – Seattle Seahawks, Minnesota Vikings, New York Giants – offensive lineman
Omar Easy – Kansas City Chiefs
John Ebersole – New York Jets – linebacker
Bobby Engram – Chicago Bears, Seattle Seahawks, Kansas City Chiefs, Cleveland Browns – wide receiver
Curtis Enis – Chicago Bears – running back
Sean Farrell – Tampa Bay Buccaneers, New England Patriots, Denver Broncos, Seattle Seahawks – guard
Chafie Fields – San Francisco 49ers, Denver Broncos, New York Jets – wide receiver
Scott Fitzkee – Philadelphia Eagles, San Diego Chargers, Philadelphia Stars (USFL) – wide receiver
Marlon Forbes – Chicago Bears, Cleveland Browns – defensive back
Mitch Frerotte – Buffalo Bills, Seattle Seahawks – guard
Chuck Fusina – Tampa Bay Buccaneers, Green Bay Packers, Philadelphia Stars (USFL) – quarterback
Gregg Garrity – Pittsburgh Steelers, Philadelphia Eagles – wide receiver
Sam Gash – Baltimore Ravens, New England Patriots, Buffalo Bills – fullback
John Gerak – Minnesota Vikings, St. Louis Rams – offensive guard
Charlie Getty – Kansas City Chiefs, Green Bay Packers – offensive tackle
Ralph Giacomarro – Atlanta Falcons, Denver Broncos – punter
Reggie Givens – San Francisco 49ers, Washington Redskins – linebacker
Keith Goganious – Buffalo Bills, Jacksonville Jaguars, Baltimore Ravens – linebacker
Dave Graf – Cleveland Browns, Washington Redskins – linebacker
Don Graham – Tampa Bay Buccaneers, Buffalo Bills, Washington Redskins – linebacker
Garry Gilliam – offensive tackle 
John Gilmore – Tampa Bay Buccaneers – tight end, #88
Rosey Grier – New York Giants, Los Angeles Rams – defensive lineman
Mike Guman – Philadelphia Eagles, Green Bay Packers, Seattle Seahawks – running back
Christian Hackenberg – quarterback
Tamba Hali – Kansas City Chiefs – defensive end/linebacker, #91
Jack Ham – Pittsburgh Steelers – linebacker
Harry Hamilton – New York Jets, Tampa Bay Buccaneers – safety
Shelly Hammonds – Minnesota Vikings – defensive back
Chris Harrell – Arizona Cardinals, Miami Dolphins – safety
Franco Harris – Pittsburgh Steelers, Seattle Seahawks – tailback
Mike Hartenstine – Chicago Bears – defensive end
Jeff Hartings – Detroit Lions, Pittsburgh Steelers – guard, center
Michael Haynes – Chicago Bears, New Orleans Saints, New York Jets – defensive end
Ron Heller – Tampa Bay Buccaneers, Philadelphia Eagles, Miami Dolphins – offensive tackle
Kim Herring – Baltimore Ravens, St. Louis Rams, Cincinnati Bengals – safety
Jordan Hill – Detroit Lions – defensive tackle, #97
Dick Hoak – Pittsburgh Steelers – running back
Gerald Hodges – Arizona Cardinals – linebacker, #50
Rob Holmberg – Los Angeles/Oakland Raiders, Indianapolis Colts, New York Jets, Minnesota Vikings, New England Patriots, Green Bay Packers – linebacker
John Hufnagel – Denver Broncos – quarterback
Josh Hull – linebacker #56
Tom Hull – San Francisco 49ers, Green Bay Packers – linebacker
Leonard Humphries – Indianapolis Colts – defensive back
Tony Hunt – Philadelphia Eagles – running back
Greg Huntington – Washington Redskins, Jacksonville Jaguars, Chicago Bears – offensive lineman
Joe Iorio – Indianapolis Colts – center
Ray Isom – Tampa Bay Buccaneers – safety
Kenny Jackson – Philadelphia Eagles, Houston Oilers – wide receiver
Tyoka Jackson – Miami Dolphins, Tampa Bay Buccaneers, St. Louis Rams, Detroit Lions – defensive end
Charlie Janerette – Los Angeles Rams, New York Giants New York Jets, Denver Broncos – guard
Bryant Johnson – wide receiver, #80
Ed Johnson – Carolina Panthers – defensive tackle, #99
Larry Johnson – Kansas City Chiefs, Washington Redskins – tailback, #27
Tim Johnson – Pittsburgh Steelers, Washington Redskins, Cincinnati Bengals – defensive lineman
Bhawoh Jue – Green Bay Packers, San Diego Chargers, St. Louis Rams, Arizona Cardinals – safety
Joe Jurevicius – New York Giants, Tampa Bay Buccaneers, Seattle Seahawks, Cleveland Browns – wide receiver
Vyto Kab – Philadelphia Eagles, New York Giants, Detroit Lions – tight end
Jeremy Kapinos – Pittsburgh Steelers – punter, #3
Jimmy Kennedy – New York Giants – defensive tackle, #73
Jim Kerr – Washington Redskins – safety
Justin King – St. Louis Rams – cornerback, #32
Terry Killens Houston Oilers/Tennessee Titans, San Francisco 49ers – linebacker
Ethan Kilmer – Cincinnati Bengals, Miami Dolphins – defensive back
Warren Koegel – Oakland Raiders, New York Jets – center
Roger Kochman – Buffalo Bills – halfback
Matt Kranchick – Pittsburgh Steelers, New York Giants – tight end
Larry Kubin – Washington Redskins, Buffalo Bills, Tampa Bay Buccaneers – linebacker
Pete Kugler – San Francisco 49ers, Philadelphia Stars (USFL) – defensive lineman
Justin Kurpeikis – Pittsburgh Steelers, New England Patriots, Cleveland Browns, Hamburg Sea Devils, Detroit Lions – linebacker
Ted Kwalick – Oakland Raiders, San Francisco 49ers – tight end
Dennis Landolt – San Francisco 49ers – offensive lineman (Practice Squad)
Paul Lankford – Miami Dolphins – defensive back
Phil LaPorta- New Orleans Saints, - offensive tackle
Jim Laslavic – Detroit Lions, San Diego Chargers, Green Bay Packers – linebacker
Sean Lee – Dallas Cowboys – linebacker, #50
Bill Lenkaitis – San Diego Chargers, New England Patriots – offensive lineman
Pete Liske – Philadelphia Eagles – quarterback
Lew Luce – Washington Redskins – running back
David Macklin – Indianapolis Colts, Arizona Cardinals, Washington Redskins, Kansas City Chiefs – cornerback
Tim Manoa – Cleveland Browns, Indianapolis Colts – running back
Rich Mauti – New Orleans Saints, Washington Redskins – wide receiver
Aaron Maybin – Buffalo Bills, New York Jets, Cincinnati Bengals, Toronto Argonauts - linebacker
Mark Markovich – Detroit Lions – San Diego Chargers – guard
Shawn Mayer – New England Patriots, Atlanta Falcons, Cleveland Browns, Hamburg Sea Devils – defensive back/safety
Mike McCloskey – Houston Oilers, Philadelphia Eagles – tight end
Eric McCoo – Philadelphia Eagles – running back
Quintus McDonald – Indianapolis Colts – linebacker
O.J. McDuffie – Miami Dolphins – wide receiver
Matt McGloin – Oakland Raiders, Philadelphia Eagles, Houston Texans - quarterback
Kareem McKenzie – offensive tackle, #67
Mike Meade – Green Bay Packers, Detroit Lions – running back
Lance Mehl – New York Jets – linebacker
Mike Michalske – New York Yankees, Green Bay Packers – guard
Matt Millen – San Francisco 49ers, Oakland Raiders, Washington Redskins – linebacker
Stan Mills – Green Bay Packers, Akron Pros – fullback
Brian Milne – Cincinnati Bengals, Seattle Seahawks, New Orleans Saints – fullback
Rich Milot – Washington Redskins – linebacker
Lydell Mitchell – Baltimore Colts, San Diego Chargers, Los Angeles Rams – tailback
Lenny Moore – Baltimore Colts – tailback
Derek Moye – wide receiver, #14
Mike Munchak – Houston Oilers, Tennessee Titans – offensive guard
Jim Nelson – Green Bay Packers, Minnesota Vikings, Indianapolis Colts – linebacker
John Nessel – Atlanta Falcons – guard
Leo Nobile – Washington Redskins, Pittsburgh Steelers – guard, linebacker
Brandon Noble – Dallas Cowboys, Washington Redskins – defensive tackle
Jordan Norwood – Denver Broncos – wide receiver, #10
Ed O'Neil – Detroit Lions, Green Bay Packers – linebacker
Jared Odrick – defensive tackle, #98
Rich Ohrnberger –  guard, #62
Dennis Onkotz – New York Jets – linebacker
Phil Ostrowski – San Francisco 49ers – offensive guard
Lou Palazzi – New York Giants – center, linebacker
Irv Pankey – Los Angeles Rams, Indianapolis Colts – offensive tackle
Chet Parlavecchio – Green Bay Packers, St. Louis Cardinals –  linebacker
Bob Parsons – Chicago Bears – quarterback, punter, tight end
Scott Paxon – Cleveland Browns, Pittsburgh Steelers – defensive lineman
Darren Perry – Pittsburgh Steelers, San Diego Chargers, New Orleans Saints – safety
Charlie Pittman – St. Louis Cardinals, Baltimore Colts – running back
Milt Plum – Cleveland Browns, Detroit Lions, Los Angeles Rams, New York Giants – quarterback
Andre Powell – New York Giants – linebacker
Paul Posluszny – Jacksonville Jaguars – linebacker, #51
Andrew Quarless – tight end, #81
Scott Radecic – Kansas City Chiefs, Buffalo Bills, Indianapolis Colts – linebacker
Tom Rafferty – Dallas Cowboys – offensive lineman
Eric Ravotti – Pittsburgh Steelers – linebacker
Mike Reid – Cincinnati Bengals – defensive tackle
Glenn Ressler – Baltimore Colts – offensive lineman
Matthew Rice – New York Giants, Detroit Lions – defensive end
Wally Richardson – Baltimore Ravens, Atlanta Falcons – quarterback
Marco Rivera – Green Bay Packers, Dallas Cowboys – guard
Dave Robinson – Green Bay Packers, Washington Redskins – end
Mark Robinson – Kansas City Chiefs, Tampa Bay Buccaneers – safety
Michael Robinson – Seattle Seahawks – running back/wide receiver, #24
Fran Rogel – Pittsburgh Steelers – running back
Dave Rowe – New Orleans Saints, New England Patriots, San Diego Chargers, Oakland Raiders, Baltimore Colts – defensive tackle
Evan Royster – running back, #35
Todd Rucci – New England Patriots – guard
Tony Sacca – Phoenix Cardinals – quarterback
Bobby Samuels – Philadelphia Eagles – cornerback
Brad Scioli – Indianapolis Colts – defensive end
Austin Scott – Cleveland Browns – running back
Bryan Scott – Buffalo Bills – safety, linebacker, #43
Freddie Scott – Atlanta Falcons, Indianapolis Colts, Detroit Lions – wide receiver
Tim Shaw – Tennessee Titans – linebacker, #57
Tom Sherman – Cincinnati Bengals, Boston Patriots, Buffalo Bills – quarterback
A.Q. Shipley – Philadelphia Eagles, Indianapolis Colts, Baltimore Ravens, Arizona Cardinals, Tampa Bay Buccaneers – center/guard
Brandon Short – New York Giants, Carolina Panthers – linebacker
Mickey Shuler – New York Jets, Philadelphia Eagles – tight end
Mickey Shuler – tight end
Paul Siever – Washington Redskins – tackle
John Skorupan – Buffalo Bills, New York Giants – linebacker
Steve Smith – Los Angeles Raiders, Seattle Seahawks – fullback
Pete Speros – Seattle Seahawks – offensive guard/tackle
Devon Still – New York Jets
Matt Suhey – Chicago Bears – fullback
Steve Suhey – Pittsburgh Steelers – guard
Dave Szott – Kansas City Chiefs, Washington Redskins, New York Jets – offensive guard
Jimmy Tays – Early NFL player
Blair Thomas – New York Jets, New England Patriots, Dallas Cowboys, Carolina Panthers – running back
Leroy Thompson – Pittsburgh Steelers, New England Patriots, Kansas City Chiefs, Tampa Bay Buccaneers – running back
Michael Timpson – New England Patriots, Chicago Bears, Philadelphia Eagles – wide receiver
Wallace Triplett – Detroit Lions, Chicago Cardinals – halfback, first African-American to play in the NFL
John Urschel – Baltimore Ravens – guard 
Curt Warner – Seattle Seahawks, Los Angeles Rams – running back
Kenny Watson – Washington Redskins, Cincinnati Bengals – tailback
Floyd Wedderburn Seattle Seahawks – offensive tackle
Derrick Williams - Detroit Lions, Pittsburgh Steelers - wide receiver
Leo Wisniewski – Baltimore/Indianapolis Colts – defensive tackle
Stefen Wisniewski – Pittsburgh Steelers, Philadelphia Eagles, Kansas City Chiefs – offensive lineman # 61
Steve Wisniewski – Oakland Raiders – offensive guard
Jon Witman – Pittsburgh Steelers – fullback
Phil Yeboah-Kodie – Denver Broncos, Washington Redskins, Indianapolis Colts – linebacker
Alan Zemaitis – Tampa Bay Buccaneers – cornerback
Anthony Zettel – Detroit Lions, Cleveland Browns, Cincinnati Bengals, San Francisco 49ers, Minnesota Vikings, New Orleans Saints, defensive lineman
Michael Zordich – New York Jets, Arizona Cardinals, Philadelphia Eagles – safety

Other ex-players of note

Tom Bradley – former Penn State defensive coordinator
Andre Collins – Director of Retired Players, NFL Players' Association
W.T. "Mother" Dunn – first football All-American at Penn State
Chafie Fields – sports and talent agent
Fran Ganter – former Penn State assistant coach
Al Golden – head football coach, University of Miami
Red Griffiths – All-American and former U.S. Congressman (R–Ohio)
Galen Hall –  former Penn State assistant coach; former head coach of the University of Florida
Jim Heller – all-time leading tackler among defensive Linemen (#10 All defense), captain of '72 team
Ron Heller – current assistant coach, Toronto Argonauts
Dick Hoak – long-time assistant coach, Pittsburgh Steelers
John Hufnagel – current head coach, Calgary Stampeders; former New York Giants offensive coordinator
Joe Jackson, gridiron football player
Richie Lucas – former quarterback; inductee, College Football Hall of Fame
Mike McBath –  co-founder/part-owner of the Orlando Predators
John McNulty – wide receivers coach, Arizona Cardinals
Mike McQueary – former Penn State assistant coach
Bob Mitinger – former attorney for the American Football League Players Association, 1968–1969
Anthony Morelli – quarterbacks coach, Plum High School
Ed O'Neil – former assistant coach, Frankfurt Galaxy, Hamilton Tiger-Cats
Paul Pasqualoni – defensive line coach, Dallas Cowboys; former defensive coordinator, Miami Dolphins; former head coach, Syracuse University
Darren Perry – assistant coach, Green Bay Packers
Matt Rhule – head football coach, Temple University
Jon Sandusky – director of player personnel, Cleveland Browns
John Shaffer – 1986 National Championship quarterback; head of high yield credit sales, Goldman Sachs
Jack Sherry – two-sport star, captain of the 1954 Final Four Basketball Team
Scott Shirley – founder and executive director of Uplifting Athletes
Frank Spaziani – head football coach, Boston College

See also
 List of Penn State Football All-Americans

References 

Penn State Nittany Lions football players